Othniel Looker (October 4, 1757July 23, 1845) was a Democratic-Republican Party politician from Ohio. He served briefly as the fifth governor of Ohio.

Biography
Sources vary on Looker's birth location. He was born either in Morris County, New Jersey, or on Long Island, New York. His gravestone was engraved with the Morris County location.

Locker moved with his mother to Hanover Township, New Jersey, when he was two-years-old, after the death of his father. He enlisted with the New Jersey militia in 1776, and served out the remainder of the American Revolutionary War as a private.

In 1779, Looker married Pamela Clark, and circa 1788 Looker moved to Vermont and then to New York, working as a school teacher.

Career
He served in the New York State Assembly from 1803 to 1804. After receiving a land grant for his war services, Looker moved to Hamilton County, Ohio in 1804, and served in the Ohio House of Representatives from 1807 to 1810. He served in the Ohio Senate from 1810 to 1817.

While serving as Speaker of the Ohio Senate from 1813 to 1814, Looker was concurrently elevated to the governorship, after then-Governor Return J. Meigs Jr. resigned to become Postmaster General.
Looker sought re-election, but was badly defeated by the far more well-known Thomas Worthington. He continued to live in Ohio until his wife's death, and later moved to Palestine, Illinois, to be with his daughter Rachel Kitchell, and he is buried there in Kitchell Cemetery. Looker was the Ohio presidential elector in 1816 for James Monroe.

Legacy

The Village Historical Society, in Harrison, Ohio, has restored the home of former Ohio Governor Othniel Looker. The Othniel Looker House is open to the public, free of charge, on a few dates during each year, and special tours can be arranged for school groups. The Othniel Looker House is listed on the National Register of Historic Places.

References

External links 
 
 

1757 births
1845 deaths
Governors of Ohio
Members of the New York State Assembly
Members of the Ohio House of Representatives
New Jersey militiamen in the American Revolution
Presidents of the Ohio State Senate
People from Palestine, Illinois
People from Harrison, Ohio
People from Hanover Township, New Jersey
Ohio Democratic-Republicans
1816 United States presidential electors
People from Long Island
Burials in Illinois
Democratic-Republican Party state governors of the United States
19th-century American politicians